Rowing is a form of propulsion of boats and other watercraft.

Rowing may also refer to:

Boats
 Rowing (sport), competitive rowing
 Coastal and ocean rowing, rowing performed on the sea
 Ocean rowing, the sport of rowing across oceans

Exercise
 Indoor rowing, rowing machine based exercise similar to rowing boats
 Rowing exercise, resistance training exercise

Other
 Shouting match, or rowing, an argument
 A track on Soundgarden's 2012 studio album King Animal

See also
 Roing, a town in Arunachal Pradesh, India
 Paddling